"Cupid's Boogie" is a 1950 song by Little Esther backed by bandleader, and writer of the song, Johnny Otis for Savoy Records which went to #1 on the US R&B Chart.

References

1950 songs
Soul songs
Songs written by Johnny Otis
Savoy Records singles
Esther Phillips songs